A. H. Wilkinson (July 23, 1875 – June 18, 1954) was an American businessman and politician.

Born in Stuart, Iowa, Wilkinson moved with his parents to Cumberland, Wisconsin and then to Bayfield, Wisconsin. He went to public schools. He started the Bayfield National Bank, in Bayfield, Wisconsin, and was president of the Wisconsin State Board of Agriculture. Wilkinson was involved with the Republican Party. He served as town treasurer from 1897 to 1899 and as Bayfield County treasurer from 1901 to 1904. During World War I, Wilkinson served on the county draft board. From 1917 to 1921, Wilkinson served in the Wisconsin State Senate. In 1921, Wilkinson was appointed internal revenue collector and served until 1933. He lived in Milwaukee, Wisconsin where he worked as a tax consultant. Wilkinson died of cancer in Milwaukee, Wisconsin.

Notes

External links

1875 births
1954 deaths
People from Stuart, Iowa
People from Bayfield, Wisconsin
Politicians from Milwaukee
Businesspeople from Wisconsin
County officials in Wisconsin
Republican Party Wisconsin state senators